Llan Ffestiniog, also known as Ffestiniog or simply Llan, is a village in Gwynedd (formerly in the county of Merionethshire), Wales, lying south of Blaenau Ffestiniog. Llan Ffestiniog is the older of the two communities, with its church and other buildings predating most of Blaenau Ffestiniog. The population was given as 864 in the 2011 census.

Buildings
Attractions near the village include the Rhaeadr Cynfal waterfalls and the remains of the Tomen-y-Mur Roman fort and amphitheatre. A decommissioned nuclear power station lies south of the village, at Trawsfynydd.

Historic house
Situated in the square opposite the Pengwern Arms, is the oldest dwelling and established business in the area, Meirion House, a Grade II* listed building. Its name is derived from the county of Meirionydd, and the core of the building is thought to date back to 1411. Several annexes were added on over the years, with a business established in 1726. It has nevertheless retained much of its original character, including the original pitch pine and oak beams and lath and plaster ceiling, slate floors and inglenook fireplace with inset cast iron double oven. There is a headstone inlaid in the slate floor, part of which is under the second stairway, believed to have been constructed in the late 19th century.

Part of Meirion House was once a small drover's bank, known as Banc yr Ddafad Ddu ("The Bank Of the Black Sheep"). In the early 19th century, it was a drapers shop. In the early 20th century, it became a guest house with the original visitors book dating back to 1909. It was used extensively by cyclists and was at one time the official quarters of the National Cyclists Union (NCU). In the visitors book there is an entry referencing the ghost of "Elizabeth". The house was owned by Thomas John Wynn, 5th Baron Newborough until 1925, when it was sold to Robert Thomas Williams. During World War II, officials from the National Gallery stayed there, whilst working at the Cwt y Bugail quarry, which was used to house the nation's art galleries' treasures. The houses next door were built on the site of Abbey Arms, an old coaching inn, which once had its own stables.

Notable Persons
Notable persons who live, or have lived, in Llan Ffestiniog include the likes of actor, author and comedian Mici Plwm, and journalist and TV presenter Mared Parry.

Writers on the village
Elizabeth Gaskell, the Victorian era writer whose novels and short stories were a critique of the era's inequality in industrial cities and of its attitudes towards women, was fond of Ffestiniog. Mr and Mrs Gaskell visited the village and spent some time there on their wedding tour. On another, later visit in 1844, it was at the inn there that their young son William caught scarlet fever, from which he died. It was to turn her thoughts from her bereavement that she took her husband's advice and began to write her first novel, Mary Barton.

George Borrow wrote briefly about Ffestiniog and its church-side pub, the Pengwern, in his travelogue Wild Wales. He says,

Transport
Ffestiniog railway station opened on 30 May 1868. It was closed to passenger services on 2 January 1960. There are several bus services running.

See also
Festiniog and Blaenau Railway
Ffestiniog

References

External links

Landscape photographs in and around Blaenau Ffestiniog
www.geograph.co.uk : photos of Llan Ffestiniog and surrounding area

Villages in Gwynedd
Villages in Snowdonia
Ffestiniog